Joe Raymond Peace Jr. (born June 5, 1945) is an American former college football coach. He served as the head football coach at Louisiana Tech University for eight seasons, from 1988 to 1995, compiling a record of 40–44–4. Peace guided the Bulldogs football program into NCAA Division I-A—now known as NCAA Division I Football Bowl Subdivision (FBS)—competition in 1989.

Peace is an alumnus of Louisiana Tech, located in Ruston in North Louisiana. Prior to becoming the Tech head coach in 1988, he had coached at two high schools and for the rival Northwestern State University Demons in Natchitoches.

His father, Joe Peace, Sr. (1920–1992), a native of Magnolia, Arkansas, was a successful high school football coach from 1948 to 1975 at Sicily Island in Catahoula Parish in northeast Louisiana. He used the since discarded Notre Dame Box. Peace, Jr., graduated from Sicily Island High School and played football under his father. Peace's mother, the former Mary Sue Pipes (1925–2010), a native of Jena in La Salle Parish and a graduate of the University of Louisiana at Monroe, taught at Sicily Island High School, where her husband was head coach. An active civic figure, Mrs. Peace in 2001 lost a race for Sicily Island alderman.

Peace, Jr., was first married to the former Pamela Franks, by whom he has two children, Michele Peace Gulotta (born 1968) of Plaquemine and Jay Raymond Peace (born c. 1971) of North Salt Lake, Utah. His second wife is the former Carolyn Ferguson (born 1949), formerly of Shreveport, a sister of former Buffalo Bills player Joe Ferguson. Their two sons are Ray J. Peace (born ca. 1975) of Bossier City and Robert Joseph Peace (born ca. 1980).

Robert Peace played football for the University of Tennessee Volunteers in Knoxville, Tennessee. In September 2007, he married the former Courtney Fulmer, daughter of Phillip Fulmer, coach of the Tennessee Volunteers, and his wife, Victoria. After their wedding, the couple resided in Austin, Texas, where Robert Peace managed a lumber company. Phillip Fulmer and Joseph Raymond Peace were once game foes with their respective university teams. The couple has since returned to Knoxville and has two children.

Head coaching record

References

1945 births
Living people
Louisiana Tech Bulldogs football coaches
Louisiana Tech Bulldogs football players
Northwestern State Demons football coaches
People from Sicily Island, Louisiana
Sportspeople from Ruston, Louisiana
Louisiana Independents